James O'Hanlon Patterson (June 25, 1857 – October 25, 1911) was a United States representative from South Carolina.

Biography
He was born in Barnwell, South Carolina. He attended private schools in town and also in Augusta, Georgia. Later, he studied law, was admitted to the bar in 1886, and commenced practice in Barnwell, South Carolina.

Patterson was a probate judge of Barnwell County, South Carolina 1888–1892 and a member of the South Carolina House of Representatives 1899–1904. He was elected as a Democrat to the Fifty-ninth, Sixtieth, and Sixty-first Congresses (March 4, 1905 – March 3, 1911). After leaving Congress, he resumed the practice of his profession in Barnwell, South Carolina where he died on October 25, 1911. He was buried in the Episcopal Cemetery.

References

Sources

Books

External sources

1857 births
1911 deaths
People from Barnwell, South Carolina
Democratic Party members of the United States House of Representatives from South Carolina
19th-century American politicians